John Fauvel (21 July 1947 – 12 May 2001) was a British mathematician and historian of mathematics.

Education
Fauvel was from Scotland, where his father was a principal, and he attended Trinity College, Glenalmond. He then studied mathematics at the University of Essex, where he graduated in 1970, and at the University of Warwick, where he obtained his master's degree in 1973. In 1977, he obtained his MPhil from the University of Warwick under the supervision of David Orme Tall, with a thesis entitled Fuzzy Theory.

Career
From 1974, Fauvel worked at the Open University, as a professor from 1979. From 1991 to 1994, he was President of the British Society for the History of Mathematics and he also published its newsletter. From 1992 to 1996, he directed an international study group on the relations between history and mathematics pedagogy, which is affiliated with the International Commission for Mathematical Education (ICMI), and in 2000 he co-directed a major study of ICMI. In 1998, he was invited lecturer by the New Zealand Mathematical Society. Fauvel was a visiting scholar in the Mathematics Department at Colorado College on several occasions, including one on a Fulbright Fellowship during the Winter and Spring of 1999.

Fauvel died on 12 May 2001 of complications from liver disease.

Publications
Fauvel is known as the author of books on the history of mathematics, several of which have been translated.

  .
 
 
 
 With Jeremy Gray: The history of mathematics: A reader. Macmillan, 1987,  
 Mathematics through history – a source book. Livres QED.
 With Bengt Johansson, Frank Swetz, Otto Bekken, and Victor J. Katz: Learn from the Masters. MAA, 1994.

References

External links

 .

1947 births
2001 deaths
20th-century Scottish mathematicians
People educated at Glenalmond College
Alumni of the University of Essex
Alumni of the University of Warwick
Academics of the Open University
British historians of mathematics